Datang Telecom Group (officially Datang Telecom Technology & Industry Group) is a Chinese state-owned telecommunications equipment group headquartered in Beijing, China. The group was founded in September 1998 by the China Academy of Telecommunications Technology (CATT) and manufactures telecommunications equipment. It is best known for its leading role in developing the Chinese TD-SCDMA 3G mobile telecommunications standard through its subsidiary DT Mobile (formerly known as Datang Mobile). Datang Telecom Group also provides military communications infrastructure to the People's Liberation Army.

History
Datang Telecom Group was the trading name of the China Academy of Telecommunications Technology since September 1998. The academy itself was founded in 1957. In 1998 a limited company Datang Telecom Technology was also incorporated and floated in the Shanghai Stock Exchange on 21 October 1998.

In April 2007, Datang secured a 36.6% share of China Mobile's first large-scale TD-SCDMA network construction contracts.

In March 2012, Datang Telecom agreed to acquire three companies: TD-SCDMA chipmaker Leadcore Technology, handset design and manufacturing company Shanghai Uniscope Technologies, and its subsidiary Qidong Uniscope Electronics; Datang already held a 51 percent stake in Shanghai Uniscope.

Operations
Datang's business areas include high-capacity digital switching, optical networking, data communication, and digital microwave communication equipment and software and system integration services. However, revenue from these sectors is far outweighed by the company's spending on TD-SCDMA research and product development, and in recent years the company has taken out a series of heavy loans from state-owned Chinese banks to fund this development.

In 2012, the United States-China Economic and Security Review Commission released a report alleging connections between Datang and the People's Liberation Army, in particular via Datang's Tenth Research Institute in Xi'an.

Subsidiaries

  (100.0%)
 Datang Telecom Technology (33.94%)

References

External links
  

Companies based in Beijing
Government agencies established in 1957
Telecommunication equipment companies of China
Government-owned companies of China
Chinese brands
Chinese companies established in 1957
Defence companies of China